Us is the second album from Scottish indie band Mull Historical Society, and the follow-up to Loss. It includes the singles "The Final Arrears" and "Am I Wrong". Us (2003) received generally positive reviews; NME called it "a joyous slice of orchestral prozac". The track "The Supermarket Strikes Back" is a riposte to "Barcode Bypass" from Loss. After the album was released the record label, Warners, dropped the band.

Track listing
"The Final Arrears"  – 5:02
"Am I Wrong"  – 3:29
"Oh Mother"  – 3:05
"Asylum"  – 4:38
"Live Like the Automatics"  – 4:09
"Don't Take Your Love Away from Me"  – 3:52
"Minister for Genetics & Insurance M.P."  – 5:25
"5 More Minutes"  – 3:32
"Gravity"  – 4:04
"Can"  – 3:42
"The Supermarket Strikes Back"  – 4:23
"Clones"  – 4:33
"Her Is You"  – 1:58
"Us/Whiting of the People"  – 7:38
"Can’t Do It (CD Rom track)"
"You Asked Her to Marry You (CD Rom track)"
"MHS Lady (CD Rom track)"
"When I’m Awake (Cavum) (CD Rom track)"

References

2003 singles
Mull Historical Society albums